Randulf Dalland (4 May 1900 – 9 November 1984) was a Norwegian politician for the Communist Party.

Dalland was born in Bergen and was the brother of Bjarne Dalland. He elected to the Norwegian Parliament from Bergen in 1945. but was not re-elected in 1949 as the Communist Party dropped from 11 to 0 seats in Parliament.

Dalland was a member of Odda municipality council during the term 1931–1934, and of Bergen city council in 1934–1937.

From 1930 to 1932 he was editor-in-chief of Hardanger Arbeiderblad. He travelled to the Soviet Union in 1935 to attend the International Lenin School in Moscow, and fought in the Spanish Civil War in 1937. From 1950 to 1965 he was Party Secretary of the Communist Party.

References

1900 births
1984 deaths
Norwegian newspaper editors
Norwegian communists
Politicians from Bergen
Communist Party of Norway politicians
Norwegian people of the Spanish Civil War
Members of the Storting
International Brigades personnel
Spanish Civil War prisoners of war
Norwegian prisoners of war
20th-century Norwegian writers
International Lenin School alumni
20th-century Norwegian politicians